La Pernía is a municipality located in the province of Palencia, Castile and León, Spain. According to the 2014 census, the municipality has a population of 361 inhabitants.

Administrative divisions
The municipality contains the following localities:
 Areños 
 Camasobres 
 El Campo 
 Casavegas 
 Lebanza 
 Lores 
 Los Llazos 
 Piedrasluengas 
 San Juan de Redondo 
 San Salvador de Cantamuda, municipal capital.
 Santa María de Redondo i 
 Tremaya

References

External links

Municipalities in the Province of Palencia